Kayena is a rural locality in the local government area (LGA) of West Tamar in the Launceston LGA region of Tasmania. The 2016 census recorded a population of 219 for the state suburb of Kayena.

History 
Kayena was gazetted as a locality in 1967. It had previously been named Richmond Hill. Kayena is believed to be an Aboriginal word for “tongue”.

Geography
The waters of the Tamar River Estuary form the north-western boundary and part of the eastern.

Road infrastructure 
Route C724 (Rowella Road) passes through from south to north.

References

Towns in Tasmania
Localities of West Tamar Council